The Kirchliche Hochschule Berlin (Church University Berlin) was a theological university in Berlin, Germany, from 1945 to 1992, a facility of the Protestant Church in Berlin, Brandenburg and Silesian Upper Lusatia.

History 
The Berlin institution was founded by Martin Niemöller of the Confessing Church, after many theological faculties at state universities had been closed by the Nazi government, especially the Bonn faculty with Karl Barth.

The Kirchliche Hochschule Dahlem was banned by the Nazis in the year of its founding, but was run until 1941 illegally in Berlin-Zehlendorf. After World War II, the institution was reopened.

Professors of the Confessing Church included Hans Asmussen, Martin Albertz, Franz Hildebrandt, .

Journals 
 Theologia viatorum. year book of the Kirchliche Hochschule Berlin, 1948–1982 
 Berliner Theologische Zeitschrift (BThZ). from 1984,

Literature 
 Aufgabe und Weg der Kirchlichen Hochschule Berlin 1939–1955. Berlin 1956.

External links 
 Bibliotheksgebäude Teltower Damm 118 Denkmalamt

Protestant universities and colleges in Europe
1935 establishments
Schools in Berlin